The 1897 Auburn Tigers football team represented Auburn University in the 1897 Southern Intercollegiate Athletic Association football season. It was the Tigers' sixth season. The team was led by head coach John Heisman, in his third year, and finished with a record of two wins, zero losses and one tie (2–0–1 overall, 2–0–1 in the SIAA).

The team featured brothers Jim and John Penton.

Schedule

Season summary

Mercer
The season opened with a 26–0 defeat of Mercer. Fearing Georgia scouts watching for signals, Auburn did not use any throughout the game.

Nashville
Auburn beat Nashville 14–4 in a duel between fullbacks Jim Penton and Bradley Walker.

Sewanee
Auburn fought Sewanee to a scoreless tie.

Postseason
The team finished $700 in debt, and Heisman was the actor, director, and producer of David Garrick to raise the money. As such, he is founder of Auburn's first theatrical group: The A.P.I. Dramatic Club.

References

Auburn
Auburn Tigers football seasons
College football undefeated seasons
Auburn Tigers football